Daniel Roher is a Canadian documentary film director from Toronto, Ontario. He is most noted for his 2019 film Once Were Brothers: Robbie Robertson and the Band, which was the opening film of the 2019 Toronto International Film Festival.

Roher grew up in midtown Toronto, Canada in a Jewish family. He studied for three semesters at the Savannah College of Art and Design in Georgia, USA.

His 2019 film Once Were Brothers: Robbie Robertson and the Band was also screened at the 2019 Whistler Film Festival, where it was the winner of the Whistler Film Festival Documentary Award. Roher and Eamonn O'Connor were Canadian Screen Award nominees for Best Editing in a Documentary at the 8th Canadian Screen Awards in 2020, and Canadian Cinema Editors award nominees for Best Editing in a Documentary in 2020.

Roher previously directed the short documentaries Survivors Rowe, which was a CSA nominee for Best Documentary Program at the 5th Canadian Screen Awards in 2017, and Sourtoe: The Story of the Sorry Cannibal, which was a CSA nominee for Best Direction in a Web Program or Series at the 6th Canadian Screen Awards in 2018.

Released in 2022, his latest film Navalny won  Best Documentary Feature Film at the 95th Academy Awards.

References

External links

1993 births
Canadian documentary film directors
Canadian film editors
Film directors from Toronto
Jewish Canadian filmmakers
Living people
Directors of Best Documentary Feature Academy Award winners
Savannah College of Art and Design alumni
20th-century Canadian Jews
21st-century Canadian Jews